Heliosperma is a genus of flowering plants in the family Caryophyllaceae. As such, it is closely related to the large genus Silene, but its members can be told apart from Silene by the crest of long papillae on the seeds. Like members of the genus Silene and other related genera, Heliosperma is attacked by species of the anther smut fungus Microbotryum. Cases of parallel divergence events between alpine and mountain populations have been reported in this genus.

Species
Around 15 species are currently recognised in the genus:
Heliosperma albanicum K.Malý
Heliosperma alpestre Rchb. – Eastern Alps
Heliosperma chromodontum Rohrb. – Greece
Heliosperma insulare Trinajstić – Croatia
Heliosperma intonsum (Greuter & Melzh.) Niketić & Stevan. – Greece
Heliosperma macranthum Pančić
Heliosperma monachorum Vis. & Pančić
Heliosperma nikolicii (A.Seliger & Wraber) Niketić & Stevan. – Kosovo
Heliosperma oliverae Niketić & Stevan. – Montenegro
Heliosperma pudibundum Griseb.
Heliosperma pusillum Vis. – NW Spain, Pyrenees, Alps, Carpathians
Heliosperma retzdorffianum Maly – Bosnia and Herzegovina
Heliosperma tommasinii Vis. – Montenegro, Albania
Heliosperma vandasii Neumayer – Macedonia
Heliosperma veselskyi Janka – Slovenia

References

Further reading

External links

 
Caryophyllaceae genera
Taxa named by Ludwig Reichenbach